The Man and His Music is a 1981 television special by American singer Frank Sinatra and guest star Count Basie and his orchestra.

Track listing
"A Lovely Way to Spend an Evening" [Instrumental]
"Nice 'n' Easy"
"The One I Love (Belongs to Somebody Else)"
"Pennies from Heaven"
"I Loved Her"
"The Girl from Ipanema" (with Tony Mottola)
"At Long Last Love"
"Something"
"Monday Morning Quarterback"
"The Best Is Yet to Come"
"(We Had a) Good Thing Going (Going Gone)"
"Say Hello"
"I Get a Kick Out of You"
"Theme from New York, New York"
"Thanks for the Memory"

Personnel
 Frank Sinatra - Vocals
 Don Costa - Conductor
 Vincent Falcone Jr. - Piano
 Tony Mottola - Guitar
 Gene Cherico - Bass
 Irv Cottler - Drums
 Count Basie and His Orchestra

Frank Sinatra television specials
1981 television specials